Bart the Bear (January 19, 1977 – May 10, 2000) was a male Kodiak bear best known for his numerous appearances in films, including The Bear (for which he received widespread acclaim), White Fang, Legends of the Fall, and The Edge. He was trained by animal trainers Doug (b. October 8, 1942, in Erie, Pennsylvania) and Lynne Seus (née Lynda Beers on March 27, 1944, in Lincoln, Nebraska) of Wasatch Rocky Mountain Wildlife, Inc., in Heber City, Utah.

Early life
Bart was born on January 19, 1977, at the Baltimore Zoo. After reaching adulthood, he made his film debut in the film Windwalker (1981).  He grew to 9' 7.5" (2.90 m) tall and weighed 1,500 pounds (680 kg) throughout his life as an adult.

Career
Robert Redford, Morgan Freeman, John Candy, Dan Aykroyd, Daryl Hannah, Annette Bening, Ethan Hawke, Steven Seagal, Tchéky Karyo, Brad Pitt, Alec Baldwin, Trevor Howard, and Anthony Hopkins all appeared in films opposite Bart, and all were reportedly impressed with how well he was trained. Film directors Jean-Jacques Annaud and Lee Tamahori, who directed Bart in The Bear and The Edge, respectively, called Bart "The John Wayne of Bears".

Anthony Hopkins worked with Bart in two movies: Legends of the Fall and The Edge.  According to Lynne (Doug's wife), "Tony Hopkins was absolutely brilliant with Bart... He acknowledged and respected him like a fellow actor. He would spend hours just looking at Bart and admiring him. He did so many of his own scenes with Bart". Film critic Kenneth Turan called Bart's performance in The Edge "the capstone of an illustrious career" and "a milestone in ursine acting".

Bart's greatest recognition came when he starred in the title role of Jean-Jacques Annaud's 1988 French film, The Bear, playing an adult grizzly who befriends an orphaned cub and defeats hunters. Annaud auditioned fifty bear actors from all over the world before selecting Bart. In order to perform the role, Bart, trained by Seus, successfully learned several new routines and behaviors, including going against his natural abhorrence of a strange bear to accept the unrelated cub co-starring with him. Annaud remained impressed with Bart's performance even after being injured by Bart when the director, against trainers' orders, entered Bart's enclosure to pose for publicity photos. The Bear was a hit in both Europe and the United States, grossing over $31 million in the United States and over $100 million worldwide, and reportedly resulting in an Oscar nomination for Bart, which was unable to go forward because animal actors are precluded from receiving Academy Awards.

In 1998, Bart made an appearance at the 70th Academy Awards as part of a salute to animal actors. He presented an envelope to Mike Myers onstage.

Charity work
Bart was a "spokesbear" for the Vital Ground Foundation, a nonprofit conservation organization that works to preserve threatened wildlife habitat along the Rocky Mountains and on Kodiak Island, among other places in North America.

After receiving a cancer diagnosis, Bart also served as the "spokesbear" for the Animal Cancer Center at Colorado State University.

Death
In October 1998, Bart was diagnosed with cancer and later underwent surgery twice to remove tumors from his right paw. The cancer returned, however, taking away his strength and appetite and causing him to not want to take pain medication. He was euthanized on May 10, 2000, at the age of 23. He was buried on the Seus' ranch.

At the time of his death, he was filming the television documentary Growing Up Grizzly (2001) (also featuring Bart's namesake, Bart the Bear 2), which was narrated by Brad Pitt, who had also appeared in Legends of the Fall.

Legacy
Bart the Bear 2, an unrelated Alaskan brown bear cub (2000–2021), was adopted by Doug and Lynne Seus shortly before Bart's death. He has sometimes been called "Little Bart". He followed in the footsteps of the original Bart and became an established animal actor and Vital Ground ambassador.

Filmography

Film
 Windwalker (1981) – Bear
 The Clan of the Cave Bear (1986) – The Cave Bear
 The Great Outdoors (1988) – The Bald-Headed Bear (Jody)
 The Bear (1988) – The Kodiak Bear
 White Fang (1991) – Bear
 The Giant of Thunder Mountain (1991) – Bear
 Homeward Bound: The Incredible Journey (1993) – Bear
 On Deadly Ground (1994) – Bear
 Legends of the Fall (1994) – Bear
 12 Monkeys (1995) – Bear
 Walking Thunder (1997) – Walking Thunder
 The Edge (1997) – Bear
 Meet the Deedles (1998) – Circus Bear

Television
 The Life and Times of Grizzly Adams, multiple episodes (1977–78) – Ben as a cub
 The Gambler: The Adventure Continues (TV film) (1983) – Bear
 Louis L'Amour's Down the Long Hills (TV film) (1986) – The Bear
 Lost in the Barrens (TV film) (1990) – Bear
 The Young Riders, Season 1, Episode 17, "Decoy" (1990) – Bart
 Les amants de rivière rouge (Miniseries) (1996) – Bear
 70th Academy Awards – Presenter (1998)

Advertising
 Labatt Blue
 Tums
 Kodiak

See also
 List of individual bears

References

External links
 
 Vital Ground official website
 Wasatch Rocky Mountain Wildlife, Inc.

1977 animal births
2000 animal deaths
Animal deaths by euthanasia
Bear actors
Deaths from cancer in Utah
Individual animals in the United States